Medellín Municipality is a municipality in the state of Veracruz, Mexico. It is located in central zone of Veracruz, about 100 km from state capital Xalapa. It has a surface of 370.14 km2. 
The municipality of Medellín is delimited to the north by Veracruz, to the north-east by Boca del Río, to the east by Alvarado, to the south by Tlalixcoyan and to the west by Jamapa.  The municipal seat is the town of Medellín.

Agriculture
It produces principally maize, beans, green chile, rice, watermelon, mango and pineapple.

Celebrations
In Medellín, in September takes place the celebration in honor to San Miguel Arcangel, Patron of the town.

Weather
The weather in Medellín is warm all year with rains in summer and autumn.

References

External links 

  Municipal Official webpage
  Municipal Official Information

Municipalities of Veracruz